Gębice  is a village in the administrative district of Gmina Mogilno, within Mogilno County, Kuyavian-Pomeranian Voivodeship, in north-central Poland.

The village has a population of 981.

References

Villages in Mogilno County
Brześć Kujawski Voivodeship
Poznań Voivodeship (1921–1939)